Wyong is an electoral district of the Legislative Assembly in the Australian state of New South Wales. The district is a 640.55 km² urban and semi-rural electorate on the Central Coast. It covers part of Central Coast Council, including the towns of Wyong and Toukley.

History
Wyong was originally established in 1962. In 1973, it was replaced by Munmorah and a redistricted Gosford. In 1988, a recreated Wyong and The Entrance replaced Tuggerah.

In 2011 local businessman Darren Webber won the seat, becoming the first Liberal MP for Wyong, gaining a 9.5% swing. Former MP David Harris regained the seat for Labor in 2015.

Members for Wyong

Election results

References

External links 

Wyong
1962 establishments in Australia
Constituencies established in 1962
1973 disestablishments in Australia
Constituencies disestablished in 1973
1988 establishments in Australia
Wyong
City of Lake Macquarie